Marcelo Peralta (5 March 1961 – 10 March 2020) was an Argentine performer, teacher, composer, and arranger who played saxophone, piano, accordion, and the Latin American aerophones.

Early life and education

Peralta was born in Buenos Aires. He studied piano and music theory at the Antiguo Conservatorio Beethoven, where he obtained a teaching certificate in 1979. At the age of 18, he began to play the baritone sax, showing a particular interest in the music of Serge Chaloff; inspired by John Coltrane, Albert Ayler and Ornette Coleman, he learned tenor sax, then alto and finally soprano. While studying harmony and composition under tango composer Sebastian Piana, he taught himself to play trumpet, trombone, tuba, violin, clarinet, and Latin American folk instruments.

Since that time he taught at several schools. In 1980 he taught music in both elementary and high schools, as welI as at special education institutions. At the same time, he was hired as a saxophone and improvisation instructor at the Conservatorio Municipal Manuel de Falla (Buenos Aires).

Career
At 18, he began his career as a freelance musician and went on to play and record with a wide range of artists and in many styles: The Bucky Arcella Trio, Manolo Yanes, Litto Nebbia, Fabiana Cantilo, Cuatro Vientos (sax quartet), LRA National Radio Orchestra (as a soloist), to name a few.

In 1985 he met the guitar player Jorge Mancini, with whom he began to experiment in free improvisation and contemporary music; they were joined by the sax player Mariana Potenza and the percussionist Victor Da Cunha, together creating the Grupo de Improvisación Tercer Mundo (Third World improvisation Group). It was with this group that he recorded his first record as a soloist - Un Hilo de Luz (1987).

Although he had been playing the quena, the accordion and other ethnic and percussion instruments alongside the standard ones for several years, his interest in folk music was developed in 1988 when he performed and recorded with the pianist and composer Eduardo Lagos (an innovator in Argentine folklore).

He developed a personal view of improvised music when he formed his own quintet, with which he explored the roots of Latin American music. Together with musicians such as Cesar Franov, Enrique Norris, Carlos Triolo, Diego Pojomovsky, and Guillermo Bazzola, he made his second recording Escaleras de la Comprensión (Melopea Records- 1990/1991).

Over the next five years, he headed the big band Los Saxópatas (1990-1995) with which he recorded and performed throughout Argentina. In Buenos Aires, he recorded Milonga (Melopea Records- 1997) and made the debut of his solo set show in which he improvises freely on American folk tunes, interpreting bagualas, vidalas, bailecitos, and chacareras in his own unique style.

He lived in Spain, where he taught saxophone and improvisation at several music schools and performed both in:
 Festival de Jazz de Madrid, 2005-2007
 Tanjazz, 2007 (Tánger)
 Festival Internacional de Vigo Imagina-Sons, 2007
 Mostoles a todo Jazz, 2005-2006
 Munijazz (La Rioja)
 Festival de Jazz de Boadilla del Monte, 2005
 Festival Internaconal de Jazz de Ciudad Lineal, 2005
 Galapajazz 2005 – Expo 02 (Suiza)
 Festival de Jazz Soto del Real, 2003
 Festival de Jazz de Tarragona, 2003
 Festival de Jazz de Paris, 2001
 Festival de Jazz Quilmes, 199
 Alrededor del Jazz Festival, 1989
 MardelJazz, 1988
 Rock&piano- Obras Sanitarias, 1987

Death
Peralta died from coronavirus disease 2019 during the COVID-19 pandemic in Madrid, Spain on 10 March 2020, at the age of 59.

Discography
Serie Melopea Jazz Argentino Vol. 1
Litto Nebbia Cuarteto - MELOPEA / INTERDISC (DSL 66094-1)
Serie Melopea Jazz Argentino Vol. 2
Grupo de Improvisación Tercer Mundo - MELOPEA (CM 008)
Tangueando
Gustavo Fedel - MELOPEA / INTERDISC (DSL 66071)
Buscando en el Bolsillo del Alma
Litto Nebbia - MELOPEA / INTERDISC (SLI 67549-2)
Un Hilo de Luz
Marcelo Peralta y Grupo Tercer Mundo - MELOPEA (DM 014)
Serie Melopea Los Saxofonistas
Marcelo Peralta - MELOPEA (CM 017)
Escaleras de la Comprensión
Marcelo Peralta - MELOPEA (CM 064)
Homenaje a Tom Jobim
Marcelo Peralta - Litto Nebbia   MELOPEA
Milonga
Marcelo Peralta - MELOPEA (CDM 014) - NUEVOS MEDIOS IMPORT
Lo que nos gusta es esto
Santiago de la Muela – SATCHMO
Fall
Peter Dieterle - David Lenker -  Marcelo Peralta
DixFunxional Brass Band
Tony Heimer – Bob Sands – Chris Kase – Ove Larson – Greg Moore –
Steve Jordan – Marcelo Peralta – MOCO DE PAVO PRODUCCIONS
Música – Yumiko Murakami
(Jerry González – Diego Urcola – Gustavo Gregorio – Christian Howes, etc.)
PAI – 3068
Dr. Macaroni – Cum Laude
TCB- The Montreaux Jazz Label
Jazz Sinfónico – Orquesta Sinfonica de RTVE
(Solistas: Chris Kase, Bobby Martínez, Roberto Cimadevilla, Marcelo Peralta etc)

References

External links
 

1961 births
2020 deaths
Argentine composers
Argentine jazz pianists
Argentine jazz tenor saxophonists
Male saxophonists
21st-century saxophonists
Male pianists
21st-century pianists
21st-century male musicians
Male jazz musicians
Deaths from the COVID-19 pandemic in Spain
20th-century saxophonists